Encephalomyelitis is inflammation of the brain and spinal cord. Various types of encephalomyelitis include:
 Acute disseminated encephalomyelitis or postinfectious encephalomyelitis, a demyelinating disease of the brain and spinal cord, possibly triggered by viral infection.
 Encephalomyelitis disseminata, a synonym for multiple sclerosis.
 AntiMOG associated encephalomyelitis, one of the underlying conditions for the phenotype neuromyelitis optica and in general all the spectrum of MOG autoantibody-associated demyelinating diseases.
 Eastern equine encephalitis, Japanese encephalitis, Venezuelan equine encephalitis, and Western equine encephalitis: a group of viral illnesses that can affect horses and humans; collectively termed Equine encephalitis.
 Experimental autoimmune encephalomyelitis (EAE), an animal model of brain inflammation.
 Progressive encephalomyelitis with rigidity and myoclonus  (PERM) – A kind of stiff person syndrome.
 AIDS-related encephalomyelitis, caused by opportunistic Human T-lymphotropic virus type III (HTLV-III) infection.

See also
 Chronic fatigue syndrome, sometimes called myalgic encephalomyelitis.

References

External links 

Inflammatory diseases of the central nervous system
Myelin disorders